The eighth season of The Real Housewives of Atlanta, an American reality television series, was broadcast on Bravo. It aired from November 8, 2015, until April 10, 2016, and was primarily filmed in Atlanta, Georgia. Its executive producers are Lauren Eskelin, Lorraine Haughton, Glenda Hersh, Carlos King, Steven Weinstock, and Andy Cohen.

The Real Housewives of Atlanta focuses on the lives of Kandi Burruss, Cynthia Bailey, Phaedra Parks, Kenya Moore, Porsha Williams and Kim Fields. It consisted of twenty-one episodes.

This season marked the final appearance of Kim Fields.

Production and crew
In June 2015, the network announced that The Real Housewives of Atlanta had been renewed for an eighth season, The trailer and the official cast were released on September 28, 2015.
The season premiered with  "The Shades of It All" on November 8, 2015, while the seventeenth episode "Who's Been Naughty, Who's Been Nice" served as the season finale, and was aired on April 10, 2016.
It was followed by a three-part reunion that aired on March 20, March 27, and April 3, 2016, and "Secrets Revealed" that aired on April 10, 2016, which marked the conclusion of the season.
Lauren Eskelin, Lorraine Haughton, Glenda Hersh, Carlos King, and Steven Weinstock are served as the series' executive producers; it is produced and distributed by True Entertainment, an American subsidiary of the Dutch corporation Endemol.

This season began filming in August 2015 and wrapped in December 2015.

Cast and synopsis
NeNe Leakes chose to leave the series prior shortly after season 7 to focus on other business ventures. Claudia Jordan was let go from the series after she allegedly declined being demoted to a recurring capacity. Along with Jordan and Leakes, Demetria McKinney also left the series as a recurring cast member. After Leakes' departure, the series became the first Real Housewives franchise to not retain any original cast members as full-time participants. Porsha Williams returned to being a full-time housewife once again, along with former The Facts of Life actress Kim Fields. Shereé Whitfield returned to the series but in a recurring capacity, along with new cast member Shamea Morton. Throughout the season Leakes, Hampton, Jordan, and McKinney made guest appearances throughout the season.

Burruss gets some exciting news in regard to her pregnancy while Cynthia deals with not so exciting news in regard to a viral video. Kenya takes the first steps to building her home, who happens to be in the same street as Shereè. While Phaedra adjust to being a single mother as Apollo serves his sentence in prison. Kenya seeks the help of newcomer, Kim Fields, with her television Pilot, Life Twirls On and Porsha introduces her new boyfriend, Duke to the group. After last seasons divide between Kandi and Phaedra's friendship, the two meet to confront their issues. During a day on a boat, tensions collide leaving Cynthia and Porsha having physical altercation after the two have bumps in their personal relationships. The ladies take an all cast trip to Miami, along with Cynthia's friend Tammy McCall who clashes with Shereé over the past. During the trip Kim is left feeling uncomfortable and Kenya is accused for stirring the pot. Porsha pursues a new man and 2 of the ladies return to Atlanta.
After the trip, Kandi makes music with a friend, former recurring cast member Demetria McKinney. Kenya attempts to reunite with her family during a trip to Detroit.
Phaedra hosts a trip to Washington D.C. for her Save Our Sons organization and invites some of the ladies to attend. Kandi pursues another business adventure involving Todd and NeNe Leakes returns to mend her friendship with Cynthia. 
The ladies and their partners, excluding Kandi, head to Jamaica for a getaway and to shoots Cynthia's eyewear commercial where Kim takes a directorial role. To everyone's surprise, NeNe attends. Still in Jamaica, tensions arise between Cynthia and Kenya over some things Kenya allegedly said. Kenya and her new man, Matt, have some time away from the ladies. A rift between Kim and Kenya, over things Kenya has been saying forces Cynthia to get involved.
Back in Atlanta, Phaedra plans a journey with her sons to visit Apollo for the first time since he's been incarcerated. Kandi is left not knowing who she can trust after the federal agents come to her home in search of Apollo's assets. Porsha takes the first steps into preserving her fertility. Unseen footage of the season is shown during the reunion of Porsha engaging in another physical altercation outside of the final party.

 During her appearance at the reunion, Whitfield sits on the end of the left couch next to Burruss.
 Bailey's then-husband, Peter Thomas, makes an appearance at the reunion. He is seated between his wife and Moore. Whitfield moves to the end of the opposite couch, next to Fields.
 During Leakes's appearance at the reunion, she replaces Williams at the head of the couch. Williams, Parks, and Fields all move down a seat so Leakes can be seated.

Episodes

References

External links

2015 American television seasons
2016 American television seasons
Atlanta (season 8)